Kim Layton (born November 26, 1942) is an American luger. He competed in the men's singles event at the 1968 Winter Olympics.

References

1942 births
Living people
American male lugers
Olympic lugers of the United States
Lugers at the 1968 Winter Olympics
People from San Luis Obispo, California